Rwanda competed at the 2022 Commonwealth Games in Birmingham, England between 28 July and 8 August 2022. It was Rwanda's fourth appearance at the Games.

Ntagengwa Olivier and Diane Ingabire were the country's flagbearers during the opening ceremony.

Competitors
Rwanda received a quota of 20 open allocation slots from Commonwealth Sport, of which they filled 15. This quota is used to determine the overall team in sports lacking a qualifying system.

The following is the list of number of competitors participating at the Games per sport/discipline.

Athletics

A squad of four athletes was selected as of 10 July 2022.

Men
Track and road events

Women
Track and road events

Beach volleyball

By virtue of their position in the extended FIVB Beach Volleyball World Rankings (based on performances between 16 April 2018 and 31 March 2022), Rwanda qualified for the men's tournament. Two players were selected as of 19 July 2022.

Men's tournament

Group B

Quarterfinals

Semifinals

Bronze medal match

Cycling

Following the National Road Championships, a squad of eight cyclists was selected as of 5 July 2022. Moise Mugisha, who was unable to take part in the championships after being hit in a car accident, is also listed as of 10 July 2022.

Road
Men

Women

Swimming

A squad of two swimmers was selected as of 10 July 2022.

Men

References

External links
Birmingham 2022 Commonwealth Games Official site

Nations at the 2022 Commonwealth Games
Rwanda at the Commonwealth Games
2022 in Rwandan sport